, is a compilation album by the Japanese electronica artist Mitsuki Aira. It was released June 18, 2009.

The CD contains two tracks that feature the thereminvox played by Masami Takeuchi, "Science Music" and "Senjō no Merry Christmas".  The "-1 track" versions of these songs do not include the theremin.

"Mike Alway's Diary" is a cover of the song by Kahimi Karie.

Track listing 

 
 
 Happiness land (I Am Robot and Proud ver.)
 Mike Alway's Diary
 Science Music (-1 track ver.)
 Senjō no Merry Christmas (-1 track ver.)

References

Aira Mitsuki albums
2009 compilation albums